The 1992–93 Liga Artzit season saw Maccabi Herzliya, Ironi Ashdod and Hapoel Kfar Saba promoted to Liga Leumit, the former two for the first time in their histories. Hapoel Ramat Gan and Maccabi Sha'arayim were relegated to Liga Alef. Maccabi Jaffa, who finished fourth, missed out on promotion after losing a play-off with top flight club Hapoel Petah Tikva.

Final table

Promotion-relegation play-offs
Fourth-placed Maccabi Jaffa played-off against Hapoel Petah Tikva, who had finished eleventh in Liga Leumit. Hapoel won both legs to remain in the top division.

References

Liga Artzit seasons
Israel
2